David Yost or Dave Yost could refer to: 

David Yost (born 1969), American actor
David S. Yost (born 1948), American academic
Dave Yost (born 1956), American lawyer and politician
David Yost, college football coach